The 1960 UCI Road World Championships took place from 13-14 August 1960 on the Sachsenring for the two men's races, and in Leipzig for the women's race, in East Germany.

Results

Medal table

External links 

 Men's results
 Women's results
  Results at sportpro.it

 
UCI Road World Championships by year
UCI Road World Championships 1960
Uci Road World Championships, 1960
1960 in road cycling